KOZX is a radio station airing a Rock music format licensed to Cabool, Missouri, broadcasting on 98.1 MHz FM.  The station is owned by Fred Dockins, through licensee Dockins Communications, Inc. KOZX is branded as "The Rock Of The Ozarks."

References

External links

OZX